Martin Malone was a professional baseball player who played pitcher in the National Association for the 1872 Brooklyn Eckfords.

Sources

 Baseball Reference

Major League Baseball pitchers
Brooklyn Eckfords (NABBP) players
Brooklyn Eckfords players
19th-century baseball players
Year of birth unknown
Year of death unknown